Oligodendrocyte-myelin glycoprotein is a protein that in humans is encoded by the OMG gene.

References

Further reading